Spain competed at the 1964 Summer Olympics in Tokyo, Japan. 51 competitors, 48 men and 3 women, took part in 35 events in 9 sports.

Athletics

Boxing

Cycling

Six cyclists represented Spain in 1964.

Individual road race
 José Manuel López
 José Manuel Lasa
 Mariano Díaz
 Jorge Mariné

Team time trial
 José Goyeneche
 José Manuel López
 Mariano Díaz
 Luis Santamarina

Equestrian

Hockey

Sailing

Shooting

Five shooters represented Spain in 1964.
Men

Swimming

Wrestling

References

External links
Spanish Olympic Committee
Official Olympic Reports

Nations at the 1964 Summer Olympics
1964
Olympics